The 1964 NCAA University Division Swimming and Diving Championships were contested in March 1964 at Kiputh Pool at Payne Whitney Gymnasium at Yale University in New Haven, Connecticut at the 41st annual NCAA-sanctioned swim meet to determine the team and individual national champions of University Division men's collegiate swimming and diving in the United States.

This was the first championship hosted only for swimming programs in the NCAA's University Division (future Division I). The inaugural College Division (future Divisions II and III) championship was contested in Grove City, Pennsylvania and won by Bucknell. 

USC once again topped the team standings, finishing five points ahead of Indiana, and claimed their third overall title (and third title in four years).

Team standings
Note: Top 10 only
(H) = Hosts
Full results

See also
List of college swimming and diving teams

References

NCAA Division I Men's Swimming and Diving Championships
NCAA University Division Swimming And Diving Championships
NCAA University Division Swimming And Diving Championships
NCAA University Division Swimming And Diving Championships